The Pacific Tow Boat Company (also seen as the Pacific Towboat Company) was a tugboat and towing firm based in the Puget Sound area of Washington state active in the first part of the 1900s.

Course of business
The Pacific Tow Boat Company merged with the Chesley Tug Company and the Pacific Tug Company, a firm which had been established in 1900.

Vessels
Vessels owned or employed by the Pacific Towboat Company include among many others the steam tugs Ruth, Defender, and Argo (launched 1900).

Notes

References
Newell, Gordon R., ed., H.W. McCurdy Marine History of the Pacific Northwest,  Superior Publishing Co., Seattle, WA (1966).

External links 

Ferry companies based in Washington (state)
Defunct shipping companies of the United States
Defunct companies based in Washington (state)
Steamboats of Washington (state)